There are over 21,000 petroglyphs at the Three Rivers Petroglyph Site at Three Rivers, New Mexico, located midway between Tularosa and Carrizozo in Otero County on Highway 54. Many of the petroglyphs can be easily viewed from a trail open to the public which winds through the rocks for about one mile.  The petroglyphs are thought to be the product of the Jornada Mogollon people between about 1000 and 1400 AD. The site is protected and maintained by the Bureau of Land Management.

The petroglyphs at Three Rivers were recorded during a six-year project by the Archaeological Society of New Mexico's Rock Art Recording Field Schools. Photographs and records are on file at the Bureau of Land Management's District Office in Las Cruces.

Gallery

References

External links
Three Rivers Petroglyph Site BLM Website
Three Rivers Petroglyphs information
Gallery of art etched on the rocks at Three Rivers Petroglyphs
Three Rivers Petroglyph Site information
 

Petroglyphs in New Mexico
Mogollon culture
Geography of Otero County, New Mexico
Bureau of Land Management areas in New Mexico